Jakub Niewiadomski (born 9 April 2002) is a Polish professional footballer who plays as a left-back for I liga side Wisła Kraków.

Club career

Lech Poznań
Jakub Niewiadomski signed a professional contract with Lech Poznań II on 1 July 2018. He was promoted to Lech Poznań in January 2020 and attended a training camp abroad. He made his debut for the Niewiadomski club on 2 November 2020 in the cup with a 2–3 win over Znicz Pruszkow, replacing Dani Ramírez from the reserve at the 76th minute.

GKS Jastrzębie (loan) 
Niewiadomski joined GKS Jastrzębie on loan on January 22, 2021. Niewiadomski made his debut for the club on 6 March 2021, with a 2–0 win over Korona Kielce in the league match, with a 90th minute substitute. Niewiadomski scored his first goal for the club on 5 June 2021 in the 62nd minute in a 0–2 victory over GKS Belchatow in the league match.

Wisła Kraków 
He returned to Lech Poznań on 31 December 2021.In the summer of 2022, he transferred to Wisła Kraków, one of the oldest clubs in the country, for free and signed a 2-year contract. Niewiadomski made his debut for the club on 20 August 2022, with a 3–0 win against Skra Częstochowa in the league as a substitute in the 90th minute.

International career
He has been capped at youth level for Poland.

Career statistics

Club

References

External links
 
 Footballdatabase Profile
 

2002 births
Living people
Polish footballers
Poland youth international footballers
Association football defenders
Lech Poznań II players
Lech Poznań players
GKS Jastrzębie players
Wisła Kraków players
I liga players
II liga players
III liga players